Mevang is a town in the Abanga-Bigne Department of Moyen-Ogooué Province, in northwestern Gabon. It verges on the Equator near the Ogooue River on the  N3 road. The town of Mgombom lies adjacent to Mevang immediately to the east.

References
Maplandia World Gazetteer

Populated places in Moyen-Ogooué Province
Abanga-Bigne Department